The 2015 Bayamon Cup is the first edition of the Bayamon Cup, a cup tournament for clubs in Puerto Rico organized by the Puerto Rican Football Federation.

Teams
Ten teams participated in the tournament.

Football competitions in Puerto Rico
2015 domestic association football cups
2015–16 in Caribbean football leagues
2015 in Puerto Rican football